Spring Breakup is a Canadian folk duo consisting of Juno-nominated banjo player Kim Barlow, and Mathias Kom of The Burning Hell. The duo formed in the winter of 2009 in Whitehorse, Yukon, Canada. Most of Spring Breakup's songs are about romantic breakups. Their album It's Not You, It's Me was released 1 February 2011 on Guelph's Label Fantastic!.

Discography

Albums
 Spring Breakup (2009)
 ''It's Not You, It's Me (2011)

See also

Music of Canada
List of bands from Canada
List of Canadian musicians

References

External links
 Spring Breakup at www.springbreakupmusic.com
 Label Fantastic! at labelfantastic.com

Musical groups established in 2009

Yukon music 
Canadian folk music groups